"Not Enough Love in the World" is a soft rock song written by Don Henley, Danny Kortchmar, and Benmont Tench.  The lyrics describe a rocky relationship, with the singer proclaiming he's still in love. It is rumored that it was about Henley's relationship with Stevie Nicks (whom fellow Eagle Joe Walsh later dated), but their relationship only lasted a year.

Song information 
Henley included the song on his 1984 album Building the Perfect Beast. It was released as a single in 1985 and hit #34 on the Billboard Hot 100. The music video was directed by Timothy Hutton.

Reception
Cash Box said that "this mid-tempo and 'beat-heavy rocker is a perfect vehicle for the ex-Eagle’s unique vocals"

Personnel 
 Don Henley – lead and harmony vocals, keyboards, percussion
 Benmont Tench – keyboards
 Danny Kortchmar – guitars 
 Tim Drummond – bass
 Ian Wallace – drums

Chart performance

Cher version 
In 1996, Cher released her version of "Not Enough Love in the World" as the third official European single from her 21st studio album It's a Man's World.  The single version is shorter than the album version and is slightly remixed. Allmusic highlighted this cover on her album.

Track listing
UK cassette single
"Not Enough Love in the World" (Single Edit) – 3:45
"One by One" (Sam Ward W Mix) – 4:26

UK CD single
"Not Enough Love in the World" (Single Edit) – 3:45
"One by One" (Sam Ward W Mix) – 4:26
"One by One" (Junior Vasquez Club Vocal Mix) – 8:45

Charts

References

External links
Official Cher site
Warner official site

1985 singles
1996 singles
Don Henley songs
Cher songs
Geffen Records singles
Songs written by Danny Kortchmar
Songs written by Don Henley
Songs written by Benmont Tench
Song recordings produced by Stephen Lipson
Warner Music Group singles
Articles containing video clips
1984 songs